Bjorn Kellerman (born 25 May 1990) is a Dutch former field hockey player who played as a forward.

Club career
Kellerman started playing hockey at Zeewolde. He then played for Amersfoort and in 2009 he moved to SCHC. After three seasons with SCHC he made a transfer to Rotterdam. With Rotterdam he won their first national title in the 2012–13 season. In 2015, he moved to Kampong, where he won the Euro Hockey League in his first season. In January 2022, he announced he would leave Kampong after seven years at the end of the season.

International career
Kellerman was a part of the Dutch squad which won the Indoor World Championship in 2015. He made his debut for the national team at the 2015 Hockey World League Final. He won the European title in 2017 and in June 2019, he was selected in the Netherlands squad for the 2019 EuroHockey Championship. They won the bronze medal by defeating Germany 4–0. In September 2021 he announced his retirement from the national team after he was dropped for the 2020 Summer Olympics squad in June.

Honours

International
Netherlands
 EuroHockey Championship: 2017
 Indoor World Cup: 2015

Club
Rotterdam
 Hoofdklasse: 2012–13

Kampong
 Euro Hockey League: 2015–16
 Hoofdklasse: 2016–17, 2017–18

Acme Chattogram
 Hockey Champions Trophy Bangladesh: 2022

References

External links

1990 births
Living people
People from Ede, Netherlands
Sportspeople from Gelderland
Dutch male field hockey players
Male field hockey forwards
SCHC players
HC Rotterdam players
SV Kampong players
Men's Hoofdklasse Hockey players